Aïcha Mohamed Robleh (born 1965) is a Djiboutian writer.

Robleh was born in Djibouti, and holds a degree in the field of workplace relations, focusing on work-health matters.  She was a departmental head in the office of the Minister for Employment until in 2003 she was elected to the National Assembly.   In 2005 she became the Minister of Promotion of Women, Family Well-Being, and Social Affairs.  She has written numerous plays, and is the founder of the stage company La Voix de l'Est.  In 1998 UNESCO recognized her play La  Dévoilée. A film which she directed based on her work, on the subject of female genital mutilation, was premiered in 2015.

References

1965 births
Living people
Djiboutian women writers
Djiboutian dramatists and playwrights
Women dramatists and playwrights
Government ministers of Djibouti
Members of the National Assembly (Djibouti)
20th-century women writers
20th-century dramatists and playwrights
21st-century women writers
21st-century dramatists and playwrights
People from Djibouti (city)
21st-century women politicians
Women government ministers of Djibouti